Bortkiewicz is a surname of Polish-language origin. Notable people with the surname include:

 Ladislaus Bortkiewicz (1868–1931), Polish-Russian economist and statistician
 For Bortkiewicz distribution, see Poisson distribution
 For Bortkiewicz' interpretation of Karl Marx's value theory, see Temporal single-system interpretation
 Sergei Bortkiewicz (1877–1952), Ukrainian-Polish-Austrian pianist and composer
 List of compositions by Sergei Bortkiewicz
 
 

Polish-language surnames